"King of the Fall" is a song by Canadian singer the Weeknd.  It was released as a promotional single to streaming services on July 20, 2014, to promote his King of the Fall Tour. The song was later officially re-released by XO and Republic Records on September 25, 2020. It accompanied the release of his remixed track "Rambo (Last Blood)" on the deluxe edition of Bryson Tiller's first studio album Trapsoul. A remix of the song featuring American rapper Ty Dolla Sign and Canadian rapper Belly was released on October 20, 2014, shortly following the release of the remix for "Often".

Background and release
The initial release of "King of the Fall" followed that of his 2014 single "Often" (which was released a month prior) and the announcement of his 2014 King of the Fall Tour. The two songs were released to promote his aforementioned tour and to get fans excited for his second studio album Beauty Behind the Madness, which included "Often" but excluded "King of the Fall".

The song was officially released to streaming services and digital retailers on September 25, 2020, after a six year period of unofficial uploads to streaming platforms such as Spotify. It followed the official release his remixed track "Rambo (Last Blood)" and the special Kiss Land episode of his Apple Music 1 radio show Memento Mori, which featured unreleased demos and songs from his early career.

Critical reception
"King of the Fall" is considered by critics and fans alike as being a staple song in the Weeknd's discography. Alyson Lewis from uDiscover Music  ranked the song as being Tesfaye's second most career defining track, complimenting his delivery and saying that song contains some his most potent verses. Pranav Trewn from Stereogum ranked the song as being the ninth best in his discography, with him praising his singing and rapping on the song and calling it a "tour de force of all the places the Weeknd's voice can go".

Commercial performance
In 2014, due to its limited initial release, "King of the Fall" was only eligible to chart at number one on the US Billboard + Twitter Trending 140. However, following its official release to digital retailers and mainstream streaming services in 2020, the song was able to debut at number 18 on the US Billboard Hot R&B Songs chart.

Music video
The music video for "King of the Fall" was released on August 28, 2014. It was directed by Kid Studio and features the Weeknd walking through his hometown of Toronto.

Charts

Release history

References

2014 songs
2014 singles
The Weeknd songs
Republic Records singles
XO (record label) singles
Songs written by DaHeala
Songs written by the Weeknd
Song recordings produced by the Weeknd